Richard Davies (born 28 June 1950) is an English actor and writer, born Richard Davis in London. He is also credited as Richard Davies, Richard A. Davies and Richard L. Davies, and in the U.K. as Richard Hamilton. Hamilton is his mother's maiden name.

Television career 
Television acting credits include:
Murder She Wrote,
Days of Our Lives,
Bold and the Beautiful,
Passions,
Santa Barbara,
Civil Wars,
Charlie Hoover,
Mother of the Bride, and
Crossings.

Stage career 

Theatre acting credits include:
 The Lion in Winter. Nominated for Kennedy Center Award for his portrayal of Henry II.
 US Premier of Enemy! by Robin Maugham, 
 The Deep Blue Sea
 UK Premier of The Diviners
 West Coast premier of Christie in Love by Howard Brenton.

Writing career 
Davies has self-published a play and two novels (one co-written with his wife, Lili Turkzadeh-Davies).

References

English male television actors
English male stage actors
21st-century English novelists
English short story writers
Living people
1950 births
English male short story writers
English male novelists
21st-century British short story writers
21st-century English male writers